Yisrael Alter (October 1895 – 20 February 1977), also known as the Beit Yisrael, after the works he authored, was the fifth Rebbe of the Hasidic dynasty of Ger, a position he held from 1948 until 1977.

Life 
He escaped from Poland during the Holocaust, and settled in Palestine during 1940. In 1945, he learned that the Nazi regime had murdered his wife, daughter, son, and grandchildren. He remarried, but had no children.

Following the death of his father, Rabbi Avraham Mordechai Alter, the fourth Rebbe of Ger, in 1948, he became a forceful leader of his growing followers in the Ger Hasidic movement, as well as became very active in the political life of the nascent State of Israel. He would go around at night by himself to the various yeshivas, even the non-Hasidic ones, and check on the students. He would also have one of his agents call an especially good student to talk to him, thereby gaining many new and outstanding followers.

He married Perl Weinfeld, daughter of Rabbi David.

Rabbi Yisrael also known as the "Sharfer (sharp) Rebbe", left a great impression on people from all walks of life who came in contact with him, and was highly respected by all Hasidic circles. His idea was to elevate every person to somehow become one level higher than his present state. There are countless stories from individuals (Hasidim and non-Hasidim) who met the Rebbe, relating how he had a tremendous spiritual impact on them and how this strong impression will never leave them. What makes this even more impressive is that many of these encounters with the Rebbe were for a very short period of time.

Rabbi Yisrael actively encouraged a strong competitive rivalry between the young man in his yeshivot - in particular, early morning learning, prayers, and Tischen (meals led by the Rebbe on Shabbat and Holidays).

He was a charismatic leader with a dynamic personality, quick wit, and an unpredictable nature.

Rabbi Yisrael became a powerful force within the Agudat Israel of Israel party, and guided its work in the Israeli Knesset, concluding alliances with various other political parties to further the causes of Haredi Judaism in the Jewish state.

He died of bowel obstruction in 1977, leaving no heir. He was succeeded by his brother, Rabbi Simcha Bunim Alter. After his death, his widow performed chalitza on Rabbi Simcha Bunim, in accordance with halakah.

References

External links
 Film of Rabbi Alter burning the leavened bread on the eve of the Jewish feast of Passover

Rebbes of Ger
1895 births
1977 deaths
Burials at the Jewish cemetery on the Mount of Olives
Israeli Hasidic rabbis
Moetzes Gedolei HaTorah
Polish Hasidic rabbis
20th-century Polish rabbis
People from Góra Kalwaria